Christopher James Coy (born May 1, 1986) is an American actor. He is known for portraying Calvin Bunker on Cinemax's Banshee, L.P. Everett on HBO's Treme, Martin on AMC's The Walking Dead, and Paul Hendrickson on HBO's The Deuce.

Life and career
He is perhaps best known for playing L.P. Everett on the HBO series Treme. and Barry Horowitz on the HBO series True Blood. He also had recurring roles as a cannibal named Martin in season five of The Walking Dead and Calvin Bunker in Banshee. He has also appeared in Hostel: Part III, Sx Tape, Deliver Us from Evil, and The Barber. He appeared in the Amazon Prime Video series The Peripheral.

Filmography

Film

Television

References

External links
 

1986 births
21st-century American male actors
American male film actors
American male television actors
Living people
Male actors from Louisville, Kentucky